McKinley Heights is a historic conservation neighborhood located in the near South Side of the City of St. Louis. It was rated as a Top 10 Neighborhood for young adults in the St. Louis metropolitan area. The neighborhood is bounded by I-44 to the north, Jefferson Avenue to the west, and I-55 and Gravois Boulevard to the east and south. There are restaurants and entertainment in the adjacent Soulard and Lafayette Square neighborhoods. Three bus routes provide a commute downtown or throughout the City. There are three churches and several neighborhood businesses. There is also 1 6th-12th Grade High School, McKinley Classical Leadership Academy

Demographics

In 2020 McKinley Height's racial makeup was 52.3% White, 37.8% Black, 0.1% Native American, 1.5% Asian, 7.8% Two or More Races, and 0.5% Some Other Race. 3.2% of the population was of Hispanic or Latino origin.

References

Neighborhoods in St. Louis